Gutshot Straight is a 2014 American direct-to-video action film directed by Justin Steele and starring George Eads, AnnaLynne McCord, Stephen Lang, Steven Seagal, Tia Carrere, Vinnie Jones, Ted Levine, and Fiona Dourif.

Plot
Jack (George Eads) is a professional poker player who gets involved with the underworld after taking a wager proposed by gambler Duffy (Stephen Lang). In order to protect his family and himself, Jack must outwit Duffy's brother Lewis (Ted Levine) and scheming wife May (AnnaLynne McCord), each of whom are trying to force him into murdering the other. Jack seeks the help of Paulie Trunks (Steven Seagal), a loan shark who is looking to collect on Jack's poker debts and wants to protect his investment.

Cast

Production
The movie was filmed in Las Vegas, Nevada.

References

External links
 
 

2014 films
2014 action thriller films
American action thriller films
Films about gambling
Films shot in Los Angeles
Lionsgate films
2010s English-language films
2010s American films